Dana Sensenig (born November 30, 1984) is an American field hockey player. She competed in the women's tournament at the 2008 Summer Olympics.

References

External links
 

1984 births
Living people
American female field hockey players
Olympic field hockey players of the United States
Field hockey players at the 2008 Summer Olympics
Sportspeople from Lancaster, Pennsylvania
21st-century American women